Nevermore was an American heavy metal band from Seattle, Washington, United States.

Nevermore may also refer to:

Literature
 "Nevermore", famous line from "The Raven", a poem by Edgar Allan Poe (Quoth the Raven, "Nevermore.")
 Nevermore, a science fiction graphic novel by Dean Koontz
 Nevermore (novel), a novel by William Hjortsberg
 Nevermore: The Final Maximum Ride Adventure by James Patterson

Film and television
 Nevermore (2006 film), a 2006 German film starring Leonard Proxauf
 Nevermore (2007 film), a 2007 film starring Vincent Spano
 Nevermore (audio drama), a 2010 Doctor Who audio play
 Nevermore, a 2018 short starring Edward W. Hardy
 Nevermore Academy, the boarding school in the 2022 TV series Wednesday

Other uses
 Nevermore: The Imaginary Life and Mysterious Death of Edgar Allan Poe, a musical based on the life of Edgar Allan Poe
 "Nevermore" (song), a song by rock band Queen
 Nevermore, a solo violin piece by Edward W. Hardy
 Nevermore, painting by Paul Gauguin

See also 
 Evermore (disambiguation)
 Forever More (disambiguation)